Agência Estado is a Private News Agency in Brazil. It was started by Brazilian media group Grupo Estado.

References

External links
Agência Estado website 

News agencies based in Brazil
International broadcasting
1970 establishments in Brazil